The Formula Ford Festival is an annual meeting of Ford-powered single-seat racing cars which is held at the end of the British racing season, at the Brands Hatch motor racing circuit in the county of Kent, in Southern England. The events are held over the course of a weekend and although various classes of past and present Formula Fords are present, the high point for many is the championship in which young but skilled drivers from Ford competitions in Europe and beyond race against one another. Often it is a rare chance to compare the skills of drivers who take part in different Ford competitions around the world. Many winners of the festival have gone on to enjoy professional careers in various branches of motorsport - including fourteen who have raced in Formula One.

The event is administered by the British Racing and Sports Car Club.

History

Inception
The inaugural season in 1972 took place at Snetterton, where the festival was held until 1975. It then moved to Brands Hatch where it has stayed to date.

The Kent years
The Kent engine was the lead engine in early Formula Ford, and so from the first festival in 1972 until the Zetec was introduced in 1993.

The Zetec years
The 1800 cc Zetec engine was the leading engine from 1993 until the Duratec took over in 2006. Zetec remained an engine sub-class until 2014.

The Duratec engine
The 1600 cc Duratec engine is currently used in the leading races although the Zetec and Kent engines are still used in junior and classic classes of racing. Duratec remained the Festival champion class until 2014.

Loss of prominence
For many years the festival was the highlight of the Formula Ford season. Entries of several hundred cars from all over the Formula Ford world were common into the 1990s, with racers competing in knockout heats to decide the grid for a grand final. Entries have been declining and recent Festivals have struggled to attract more than 40-50 cars, enough for two heats and a final.
Support races from other classes e.g. Caterham, Club F3, and Historic Sports 2000 have also been included in the program. This is because although the event still has the atmosphere of past years its position as a rite of passage for young drivers has largely been usurped by other junior formulae, mostly by the FIA backed Formula 4 and karting.

More "historic" FF1600 cars have been turning up for the supporting races than contemporary Zetecs, however, in 2006, the Festival saw the Duratec engine for the first time thereby having a final for all 3 marques at one meeting for the first time. The Walter Hayes Trophy now recognises the continuing interest in 1600cc 'Kent' Formula Ford and attracted over 150 entries in 2006, including several drivers more commonly seen in much more senior formulae, including current two-time IndyCar Series champion Josef Newgarden, who won the 2008 Kent class, the most recent prominent champion to have raced in this festival.

From 2015 the Festival became exclusively for Kent engined cars, restoring the Festival to its pre-1993 format.

Winners
Below is a list of overall festival winners. Since 1993, a secondary festival was run in alongside for older specification cars running the Ford Kent engine. Since 2009, a third event has also been held for cars using the Ford Zetec engine.

''* denotes later raced in Formula One

See also
Formula Ford
Snetterton Motor Racing Circuit
Brands Hatch

References

External links
 BRSCC Homepage
 Facebook Group to get 50,000 fans to the Festival

Sources
BRSCC Calendar
 Motor Sport Vision (Owners of Brands Hatch)
 Johnny Herbert
Club Formula Ford
 Historics

Formula Ford
Formula races